Isoptericola nanjingensis is a Gram-positive bacterium from the genus Isoptericola which has been isolated from soil from Nanjing, China.

References

External links
Type strain of Isoptericola nanjingensis at BacDive -  the Bacterial Diversity Metadatabase

Micrococcales
Bacteria described in 2012